The Jubilee Line Extension (JLE) is the extension of the London Underground Jubilee line from  to  through south and east London. An eastward extension of the line was first proposed in the 1970s. As part of the development of London Docklands, the line was extended to serve Canary Wharf and other areas of south and east London. Construction began in 1993, and it opened in stages from May to December 1999.

Stations 

The section between Charing Cross and Green Park, which diverges to the northwest, is now unused for passenger services but is maintained for emergency use. The abandoned platforms are occasionally rented out by TfL as a film set e.g. Skyfall, Thor: The Dark World and Woman in Black II. This section may be re-used as part of an extension of the Docklands Light Railway from Bank.

Planning

Original 1970s plans
In anticipation of this, the tunnels of the first phase of the line continued eastward from Charing Cross under Strand almost as far as Aldwych.

This plan was modified shortly before the Jubilee line opened in 1979. Under the new plan (known for planning purposes as the River Line), it would run to Fenchurch Street as before and continue via the Isle of Dogs, Royal Docks and Woolwich Arsenal to the "new town" at Thamesmead. A branch from Silvertown to Beckton would have provided a link to a new depot. This route is not dissimilar to the Crossrail route through the Docklands.

Jubilee Line Extension 
Plans to extend the line were revived in the late 1980s, prompted by the proposed development of London Docklands and Canary Wharf, which substantially increased the predicted numbers of jobs in the Isle of Dogs and required a transport network with much greater capacity than provided by the Docklands Light Railway (DLR). Initially, Olympia and York, the developers of Canary Wharf, proposed building a dedicated 'Waterloo and Greenwich Railway' from Waterloo through London Bridge to Canary Wharf and then to Westcombe Park in Greenwich, costing £400 million. However, London Transport resisted this, preferring to wait for the results of studies into new railway construction. One of these, the East London Railway Study, recommended an extension of the Jubilee line from Green Park to Westminster, then following the route of the Waterloo and Greenwich Railway, continuing to Stratford via Canning Town alongside the North London Line. This option was adopted, with an estimated cost of £2.1 billion to which Olympia and York would make a £400 million contribution, the original cost estimate of the Waterloo and Greenwich Railway (Mitchell 2003). In the end it cost £3.5bn, partly because of huge cost overruns during construction. Where initially the developers were to pay for a large part of the extension, their final contribution was less than 5%.

The extension was authorised in 1990. A station was originally planned at Blackwall, but this was replaced by diverting the line between Canary Wharf and Stratford underneath the Thames to serve the Greenwich peninsula at  station. Plans for the Millennium Dome did not yet exist, and this diversion was made to provide for a planned housing development on the site of disused gasworks. British Gas plc contributed £25 million to the scheme. The stations at Southwark and Bermondsey were not initially certain. Main works were authorised by the London Underground Act 1992, with additional works allowed by the London Underground (Jubilee) Act 1993.

The project required the construction of a new depot to serve the extended line, given the increased number of trains could not be accommodated at the existing Neasden Depot - hence a site at Stratford Market was chosen.

Construction 
Construction officially started in December 1993 and was expected to take 53 months. Tunnelling was delayed after a collapse during the Heathrow Express project in October 1994, which used the same New Austrian Tunnelling method. Indeed, construction under Westminster caused the Elizabeth Tower to tilt slightly. By November 1997, a September 1998 date was planned. By June 1998, opening was planned in Spring 1999. By November 1998, a phased opening, previously rejected, was being considered, with Stratford to North Greenwich planned for spring 1999, to Waterloo for summer 1999, and the link to the Jubilee line for autumn 1999.

The new Stratford Market Depot (designed by Chris Wilkinson Architects) was completed in March 1998 - allowing for testing and commissioning of the new 1996 Stock trains, as well as the testing of the new extension itself. Following this, the first phase of the line opened on 14 May 1999, the second on 24 September, and the third on 20 November. Westminster, complicated by the interface with the subsurface platforms, which remained in operation, opened on 22 December 1999, shortly before the Millennium Dome deadline. By February 1999, however, the cost of the extension had increased to a total of £3.3 billion.

The extension was supposed to have moving block signalling, designed by Westinghouse, in order to reach 36 trains per hour at peak times. As design of this overran, causing delays into 1999, this was postponed in favour of more traditional signalling. Twelve years later these features were completed, allowing for up to 33 trains per hour. It was built with a wider tunnel diameter of 4.35 m allowing a passenger walkway used for emergency purposes, unfortunately wider trains are not possible due to the narrower tunnel dimension northwards of Green Park.

The extension has proved extremely successful in relieving congestion on the DLR and in opening up access to parts of east London with formerly poor transport links. As such it allowed (theoretically - barring peak/off-peak timetable restrictions i.e. to Chesham or Mill Hill East etc.) access to all other London Underground stations with only a single change.

Design 

The design of the extension is radically different from anything else on the London Underground.

The size of the stations was a response to safety concerns—overcrowding and a lack of exits had been significant factors in the 1987 King's Cross disaster—and an attempt to "future-proof" stations by designing from the start for a high use. Most platforms and halls are full only in a busy rush hour, all provide step-free access, dual exits at either platform ends, ventilation, as well as fireproof lifts. To ease flow extra escalators (at least 3 per station) were installed, totalling 115 over the entire extension, increasing the total number of escalators over the entire Underground network by almost half.

A number of leading architects were employed to design the stations, overseen by Roland Paoletti and a small team of in-house JLE Architects. It was decided from the outset that although each station would be designed as an individual entity, they would be linked by a common design philosophy and functional elements. Spaciousness was the most noticeable, along with the shared theme of grey and silver polished metal and concrete interiors. More subtly, many stations were designed to admit as much natural light as possible.

The platforms saw another innovation: full-height platform screen doors, to improve airflow, prevent people from jumping or falling onto the track, prevent litter depositing upon the track and stop dirt circulating around the network, amongst other features. These are the first doors to be installed on a commercial railway in Great Britain.

Notes and references

Notes

References

Further reading
Mitchell, Bob (2003). Jubilee Line Extension: From Concept to Completion.
Bennett, David (2004). Architecture of the Jubilee Line Extension
Powell, Kenneth (2000). The Jubilee Line Extension

External links

 Jubilee line extension photo gallery 

London Underground infrastructure
Railway lines opened in 1999
Extensions to the London Underground
1999 establishments in England
Transport in the City of Westminster
Transport in the London Borough of Lambeth
Transport in the London Borough of Southwark
Transport in the London Borough of Tower Hamlets
Transport in the Royal Borough of Greenwich
Transport in the London Borough of Newham